The 1950 New Hampshire gubernatorial election was held on November 7, 1950. Incumbent Republican Sherman Adams defeated Democratic nominee Robert P. Bingham with 56.95% of the vote.

General election

Candidates
Sherman Adams, Republican
Robert P. Bingham, Democratic

Results

References

1950
New Hampshire
Gubernatorial